Douglas F. Tessitor is a former member of the Glendora City Council.

Tessitor was a member of the Glendora City Council beginning in 2003, re-elected in 2007 and again in 2011.  He served as the city's mayor in 2006–2007 and 2011- 2012. With a Bachelor's degree in Business Administration from USC and a Master's degree in International Management from The American Graduate School of International Management,  Tessitor has many accomplishments, such as being a member of the LA Works board of directors, a member of the San Gabriel Valley Council of Governments, and a member of the Southern California Association of Governments.

As a then sitting member of the Glendora Council, he also served on the executive board of Foothill Transit from 2005 to 2015.  He was executive board chair for the final two years.  Foothill Transit coordinates planning, contracting for, and operating public transit in the San Gabriel Valley.

Tessitor also served on the Gold Line Construction Authority from 2004 to 2018.  He was appointed chairman of the board in 2011 and served in that role until he retired in 2018.  During his tenure, the agency achieved the on-time, under budget completion of the 11.5 mile segment of the light rail project from Pasadena through Azusa and the planning, engineering and start of construction for the final 12.3 mile segment from Glendora to Montclair.

Douglas is married to his wife Cyndy, together they have three daughters and seven grandchildren.  He is also a Registered Representative with Northwestern Mutual Life in Glendora.

References

External links
Official Glendora website profile

Year of birth missing (living people)
Living people
Mayors of Glendora, California